Lanvin is a surname. Notable people with the surname include:

 Gérard Lanvin (born 1950), French actor
 Jeanne Lanvin (1867–1946), French fashion designer, founder of the French fashion house Lanvin
 Manu Lanvin (born 1974), French singer, Gérard Lanvin's son

Surnames of French origin